Abronia may refer to:

Abronia (gens), a Roman family of the Augustan age
Abronia (lizard), a genus of animals commonly known as arboreal alligator lizards
Abronia (plant), a genus of plants commonly known as sand-verbenas

Genus disambiguation pages